Wonderland is the second extended play by South Korea-based American singer Jessica. The Korean-language edition consisting of six songs was released worldwide by Coridel Entertainment on December 10, 2016, while an English-language version featuring four songs (with the exclusion of "Beautiful" and "Tonight") was released on December 30, 2016. The EP was Jessica's second music release following her departure from South Korean girl group Girls' Generation in September 2014. The song "Wonderland" was released as the EP's single on December 10, 2016.

The album was a commercial success, peaking atop the Gaon Album Chart and has sold over 38,000 copies in South Korea. It additionally peaked at number seven on the US World Albums chart.

Track listing

Notes

Charts

Year-end chart

Release history

References

External links 
 

2016 EPs
K-pop EPs
Interpark Music EPs